Luuk Verbij (born 2 August 1986 in Alphen aan den Rijn) is a Dutch judoka. He competed at the 2012 Summer Olympics in the +100 kg event.

References

External links
 
 
 

1986 births
Living people
Dutch male judoka
Olympic judoka of the Netherlands
Judoka at the 2012 Summer Olympics
Sportspeople from Alphen aan den Rijn
Universiade medalists in judo
Universiade gold medalists for the Netherlands
Medalists at the 2009 Summer Universiade
21st-century Dutch people